The 2008 World University Baseball Championship was an under-23 international college baseball tournament that was held from July 17 to 27, 2008. The final game was held on July 27, 2008 in Brno, Czech Republic. It was the 4th time the University Championship took place. Czech Republic hosted the tournament and 7 nations competed, including defending champions the United States. India was originally to have participated but withdrew.

In the end, the United States won their third University Championship, over a win against runner-up Japan.

Round 1

Standings

Game results

Round 2

Semi finals

Final round

5th place game

Bronze medal game

Final

Final standings

References

External links
Host website

World University Baseball Championship
World University Championship
International baseball competitions hosted by the Czech Republic
2008 in Czech sport
Baseball
World University Baseball Championship